The 2013 Trabzon Cup was a professional tennis tournament played on outdoor hard courts. It was the first edition of the tournament which was part of the 2013 ITF Women's Circuit, offering a total of $50,000 in prize money. It took place in Trabzon, Turkey, on 2–8 September 2013. This was the first Trazbon Cup of the year, the 2013 Trabzon Cup (2) was held a week later.

Singles entrants

Seeds 

 1 Rankings as of 26 August 2013

Other entrants 
The following players received wildcards into the singles main draw:
  Cemre Anıl
  Naz Karagöz
  Dinah Pfizenmaier
  Ege Tomey

The following players received entry from the qualifying draw:
  Melis Sezer
  Christina Shakovets
  Emily Webley-Smith
  Ekaterina Yashina

The following players received entry into the singles main draw as lucky losers:
  Ani Amiraghyan
  Claudia Coppola

Champions

Singles 

  Aleksandra Krunić def.  Stéphanie Foretz Gacon 1–6, 6–4, 6–3

Doubles 

  Yuliya Beygelzimer /  Maryna Zanevska def.  Alona Fomina /  Christina Shakovets 6–3, 6–1

External links 
 2013 Trabzon Cup (1) at ITFtennis.com

2013 ITF Women's Circuit
2013 1
2013 in Turkish tennis